Solar panels on spacecraft, covers using solar power on spacecraft
Space-based solar power, is the concept using spacecraft in space for Earth power.